Conasprella bozzettii is a species of sea snail, a marine gastropod mollusk in the family Conidae, the cone snails and their allies.

Like all species within the genus Conasprella, these snails are predatory and venomous. They are capable of "stinging" humans, therefore live ones should be handled carefully or not at all.

Description
The size of the shell varies between 30 mm and 65 mm.

Distribution
This marine species occurs off Northern Somalia.

References

 Lauer, J. M. 1991. Description of a new species of Conus (Mollusca, Prosobranchia: Conidae) from eastern Somalia. Apex 6(2):33–50, 14 figs.
 Tucker J.K. & Tenorio M.J. (2009) Systematic classification of Recent and fossil conoidean gastropods. Hackenheim: Conchbooks. 296 pp. 
  Puillandre N., Duda T.F., Meyer C., Olivera B.M. & Bouchet P. (2015). One, four or 100 genera? A new classification of the cone snails. Journal of Molluscan Studies. 81: 1–23

External links
 The Conus Biodiversity website
 Cone Shells – Knights of the Sea
 
 Holotype at MNHN, Paris

Endemic fauna of Somalia
bozzettii
Gastropods described in 1991